Mrinal Kanti Das (born 25 January 1959) is a Bangladesh Awami League politician and the incumbent Member of Parliament from Munshiganj-3.

Early life
Das was born on 25 January 1959. He has B.A. and L.L.B. and practised law. Das was born in Jamidar Para, Munshighnj.

Career
Das served as the Deputy Publicity Secretary of Bangladesh Awami League in 2010. He was elected to Parliament on 5 January 2014 from Bangladesh Awami League. He served as the Deputy Office Secretary of Bangladesh Awami League.

References

Living people
1959 births
Awami League politicians
Bangladeshi Hindus
10th Jatiya Sangsad members
11th Jatiya Sangsad members